Buprestis lineata, the lined buprestris, is a species of metallic wood-boring beetle in the family Buprestidae.

References

Further reading

External links

 

Buprestidae
Articles created by Qbugbot
Beetles described in 1775
Taxa named by Johan Christian Fabricius